Lady with the Small Foot (Czech: Dáma s malou nožkou) is a 1920 Czech silent comedy film directed by Jan S. Kolár and Přemysl Pražský and starring Olga Augustová, František Pelíšek and Gustav Machatý.

The actress Anny Ondra got her breakthrough in a supporting role, and soon under the direction of Karel Lamač had emerged as Czechoslovakia's leading comedy star.

Cast
 Olga Augustová as Lady with the Small Foot 
 František Pelíšek as Tom  
 Gustav Machatý as Archibald Pelich  
 Přemysl Pražský as Dandy  
 Svatopluk Innemann as Man in the Car  
 Anny Ondra as Dandy's friend 
 Jan S. Kolár as Man on the Roof  
 Mása Hermanová as Murderer  
 Emilie Boková as Old Street-cleaner 
 Bonda Szynglarski    
 František Herman

References

External links 
 

1920 films
Czech silent films
Czech comedy films
1920 comedy films
1920s Czech-language films
Czech black-and-white films